The Ministry of Finance is a government ministry in North Korea which is responsible for planning and managing the economic policies of the Democratic People's Republic of Korea. It deliberates the budget, establishes tax and economy policies, establishes fiscal policies and national financial management plans, organizes budgets, and discusses plans for fund management. It is a department in charge of coordination, budget and fund execution and management. It was formed in September 1948.

Ministers of Finance

See also
Cabinet of North Korea
Central Bank of the Democratic People's Republic of Korea
Economy of North Korea

References

Cabinet of North Korea
Government of North Korea
Economy of North Korea
North Korea
1948 establishments in North Korea